USS Needle (SP-649) was a United States Navy patrol vessel in commission from 1917 to 1919.

Needle was built as a private motorboat of the same name by George Lawley & Son at Neponset, Massachusetts, in 1906. On 9 June 1917, the U.S. Navy acquired her from her owner, George L. Batchelder of Medford, Massachusetts, for use as a section patrol boat during World War I. She was commissioned as USS Needle (SP-649) on 20 June 1917.

Needle carried out patrol duties for the rest of World War I and into 1919.

Needle was stricken from the Navy List on 18 August 1919 and sold to Morgan Barney of New York City on 16 September 1919.

References

Department of the Navy Naval History and Heritage Command Online Library of Selected Images: U.S. Navy Ships: USS Needle (SP-649), 1917-1919
NavSource Online: Section Patrol Craft Photo Archive Needle (SP 649)

Patrol vessels of the United States Navy
World War I patrol vessels of the United States
Ships built in Boston
1906 ships